McColley's Chapel is a Methodist chapel located between Ellendale and Georgetown, Delaware. It was listed on the National Register of Historic Places on November 30, 2011.

Description

The property consists of a single-story church facing east-northeast, surrounded by a cemetery. The church proper is a simple wood-framed gabled structure covered in asphalt shingles, with a chancel projecting from the back and a brick chimney applied to the south side. The facade features an open pediment in the gable and a pair of windows flanking the central entrance, with a wooden sign over the door; each side also has three tall, narrow double-hung windows, with a smaller window on either side of the chancel. The interior is fitted with box pews flanking a center aisle, and a pulpit and altar, also aligned with the center line of the building. The chancel opening has plain casing surmounted by a pediment; the back wall of the altar area is ornamented by column casing supporting a dentil architrave.

The cemetery contains burials from 1860 up to 2007. Some plots are surrounded by iron railings; older tombstones are generally of marble and are hard to read. Many of the stones have elaborate low relief, but some stone are simple obelisks.

History
This is the second church building on this land, which was donated by James Rudden in 1857. The first church was built by Trustan P. McColley and was named after him; it was the oldest Methodist church in Georgetown Hundred. This building fell into disrepair and was destroyed in a fire sometime in the late 1890s. The current building, its replacement, was constructed in 1898. The church is still used for services and is under the Peninsula-Delaware Conference of the United Methodist Church.

References 

Churches on the National Register of Historic Places in Delaware
Religious buildings and structures completed in 1898
Methodist churches in Delaware
Churches in Sussex County, Delaware
19th-century Methodist church buildings in the United States
Buildings and structures in Georgetown, Delaware
1898 establishments in Delaware
National Register of Historic Places in Sussex County, Delaware